Nikolay Mikhaylovich Mikhaylov was a Soviet military conductor. He was the Senior Director of the Military Band Service of the Armed Forces of the Soviet Union from 1976 to 1993.

Early life and career 
Mikhaylov was born in 1932 in the village Usa in the Bashkir ASSR. In 1945, he studied at the Moscow Military Music College. Being a cadet at the college, he took part in the Moscow Victory Parade of 1945 as a drummer of the school. In 1950 he graduated from the school and studied at the Institute of Military Conductors. From 1965 to 1970 he was the senior director of the central orchestra of the Volga Military District. In 1975, Mikhaylov was appointed deputy chief of the Moscow State Conservatory. In 1976, he was appointed Chief Conductor of the Central Military Band of the Ministry of Defense of the USSR and Chief Conductor of the Military Band Service of the Armed Forces of the Soviet Union. He commanded the massed bands during Victory Day Parades and Revolution Day Parades for 14 years from 1976 to 1990. He was released from this post in early 1993. He died in Moscow on October 22, 2006 and was buried in Vostryakovskoe Cemetery.

Legacy 
The Nikolay Mikhaylov Moscow Concert Wind Brass and All-Russian Competition of Brass Orchestras is named after Mikhaylov. Russian military bands, specifically the Military Band Service of the Armed Forces of the Soviet Union grew enormously under general Mikhaylov. The band tradition 
under his leadership was modernized as well as strengthened in order to keep up with the cultural advancement of the Soviet Armed Forces, Soviet society and international military bands. Bands became more notable and accessible in the 17 years he led the service, with the massed bands of the Moscow Military District taking part in the opening and closing ceremonies of the 1980 Summer Olympics in its debut performance to a worldwide audience.

Awards 
 Order of the Red Star
 Honored Artist of the RSFSR (1978)
 Lenin Komsomol Prize (1981)
 State Prize of the USSR (1985)
 Honored Artist of the Russian Federation

See also 
 Valery Khalilov
 Yusif Akhundzade
 John R. Bourgeois

References 

}

1932 births
2006 deaths
Russian composers
Russian male composers
Soviet composers
Soviet male composers
Soviet conductors (music)
Soviet major generals
Moscow Military Music College alumni
Russian military musicians
20th-century Russian conductors (music)
Russian male conductors (music)
20th-century Russian male musicians